Pretty Baby is an album recorded by Dean Martin for Capitol Records during two sessions on January 28 and 30, 1957. The backing orchestration was conducted by Gus Levene. The completed album was released on June 17, 1957. The album cover art features Dean Martin's second wife Jeanne Martin (née Biegger.)

Track listing

LP
Capitol Records Catalog Number T-849

Side A
"I Can't Give You Anything But Love" (Jimmy McHugh, Dorothy Fields) – 2:41
Session 4779; Master 16532. Recorded January 28, 1957.
"Only Forever" (James V. Monaco, Johnny Burke) – 2:08
Session 4784; Master 16545. Recorded January 30, 1957.
"Sleepy Time Gal" (Ange Lorenzo, Richard A. Whiting, Joseph R. Alden, Raymond B. Egan) – 2:36
Session 4779; Master 16539. Recorded January 28, 1957.
"Maybe" (Allan Flynn, Frank Madden) – 2:12
Session 4784; Master 16527. Recorded January 30, 1957.
"I Don't Know Why (I Just Do)" (Fred E. Ahlert, Roy Turk) – 2:54
Session 4784; Master 16529. Recorded January 30, 1957.
"Pretty Baby" (Egbert Van Alstyne, Tony Jackson, Gus Cahn) – 2:03
Session 4779; Master 16534. Recorded January 28, 1957.

Side B
"You've Got Me Crying Again" (Charles Newman, Isham Jones) – 1:44
Session 4784; Master 16546. Recorded January 30, 1957.
"Once in a While" (Michael Edwards, Bud Green) – 2:54
Session 4784; Master 16528. Recorded January 30, 1957.
"The Object of My Affection" (Pinky Tomlin, Coy Poe, Jimmie Grier) – 2:37
Session 4784; Master 16530. Recorded January 30, 1957.
"For You" (Joe Burke, Al Dubin) – 2:20
Session 4779; 16540. Recorded January 28, 1957.
"It's Easy to Remember" (Richard Rodgers, Lorenz Hart) – 3:16
Session 4779; Master 16533. Recorded January 28, 1957.
"Nevertheless (I'm in Love with You)" (Bert Kalmar, Harry Ruby) – 2:50
Session 4779; Master 16531. Recorded January 28, 1957.

Compact Disc
1997 EMI/Capitol combined Pretty Baby with This Time I'm Swingin! (from 1960). Catalog Number 7243 8 54546 2 9.

2005 Collectors' Choice Music reissue added four more tracks to the twelve tracks on the original Capitol LP. Catalog Number WWCCM06062.

"Me 'n You 'n the Moon" (Sammy Cahn, Jimmy Van Heusen) – 2:13
Session 4380; Master 15482-7. Recorded May 22, 1956.
"Beau James" (Herbert Baker) – 2:18
Session 6023; Master 17073-6. Recorded May 22, 1957.
"I Know Your Mother Loves You" (S. Cahn, Arthur Schwartz) – 2:41
Session 3753; Master 13751-5. Recorded April 27, 1955.
"The Lady with the Big Umbrella" (David Nelson, Danny Goodman) – 2:58
Session 3746; Master 13724-8. Recorded April 20, 1955.

Personnel
Dean Martin: vocals
Gus Levene: leader
Hy Lesnick: contractor
Alvino Rey: guitar
Vincent Terri: guitar
Joseph G. 'Joe' Comfort: bass
Nick Fatool: drums
Edwin L 'Buddy' Cole: piano
Julian C. 'Matty' Matlock: clarinet
Charles T. 'Chuck' Gentry: saxophone
Edward R. Miller: saxophone
Elmer R. 'Moe' Schneider: trombone
Charles Richard 'Dick' Cathcart: trumpet

References

External links
Dean Martin performing Pretty Baby at YouTube.com

Pretty Baby
Pretty Baby
Capitol Records albums